Psychrolutes is a genus of marine ray-finned fishes belonging to the family Psychrolutidae, the fatheads and toadfishes. Though found predominantly in the deep sea, a handful of species are present in the intertidal regions of the North Pacific rim.

Species
There are currently 11 recognized species in this genus:
 Psychrolutes inermis (Vaillant, 1888)
 Psychrolutes macrocephalus (Gilchrist, 1904)
 Psychrolutes marcidus (McCulloch, 1926) (Blobfish)
 Psychrolutes marmoratus (T. N. Gill, 1889)
 Psychrolutes microporos (J. S. Nelson, 1995)
 Psychrolutes occidentalis (R. Fricke, 1990) (Western Australian sculpin)
 Psychrolutes paradoxus (Günther, 1861) (Tadpole sculpin)
 Psychrolutes phrictus (Stein & C. E. Bond, 1978) (Blob sculpin)
 Psychrolutes sigalutes (D. S. Jordan & Starks, 1895) (Soft sculpin)
 Psychrolutes sio (J. S. Nelson, 1980)
 Psychrolutes subspinosus (A. S. Jensen, 1902)

Catalog of Fishes classifies Gilbertidia as a synonym of Pyschrolutes,  but FishBase treats it as a valid genus.

References

Psychrolutidae
 
Taxa named by Albert Günther
Marine fish genera